Elias Burton Holmes (1870–1958) was an American traveler, photographer and filmmaker, who coined the term "travelogue".

Travel stories, slide shows, and motion pictures were all in existence before Holmes began his career, as was the profession of travel lecturer; but Holmes was the first person to put all of these elements together into documentary travel lectures.

Early years
Elias Burton Holmes was born into a middle-class Chicago family, the son of a banker. His interest in travel was sparked at the age of nine when his grandmother took him to hear a then-famous travel lecturer, John L. Stoddard (whom Holmes was to meet on a subsequent trip  abroad).

In 1890, Holmes accompanied his grandmother on a trip to Europe and when he returned showed slides of his trip at the Chicago Camera Club, of which he was a member. Holmes wrote of this event: "To take the edge off the silence, to keep the show moving, I wrote an account of my journey and read it, as the stereopticon man changed slides."

Despite the success of this event, which grossed $350 for the club, it wasn't until several years later that Holmes decided to set himself up as a travel lecturer. In 1893, after sending out 2000 invitations to a select group of Chicagoans, Holmes gave two sold-out talks about a recent trip to Japan.

Travelogues
Initially Holmes had only modest success as a travel lecturer. Then in 1897, John L. Stoddard retired, creating something of a vacuum in the field. Around the same time, Holmes began to supplement his hand-colored glass slides with the then excitingly new technology of moving pictures. As the years went on, film came increasingly to dominate his lectures.

In the years that followed, Holmes traveled extensively: North and South America, Europe, Russia, India, Ethiopia, Burma (now Myanmar). He lectured about such topics as the Panama Canal, the "Frivolities of Paris," even the adventures of Richard Halliburton, one of his competitors in the travel lecture profession. He visited the first modern Olympics in 1896, rode the first trans-Siberian train, and shot what may be the first movies ever made of Japan, in 1899. In the course of his travels, he crossed the Atlantic and Pacific oceans more than 50 times. As Holmes became more well-known he brought along assistants, such as Andre de la Varre, to shoot film and stills while he made notes for his lectures, and he also employed a business manager. With the rise of Hollywood, Holmes began to make short travel films for Paramount and later Metro-Goldwyn-Mayer.

Holmes's talks—which totaled over 8000 by the end of his life—drew their largest audiences in cosmopolitan cities like New York, Boston, and Philadelphia. He catered especially to the armchair traveler with escapist fantasies, and for this reason he consciously focused his lectures on the most agreeable and scenic aspects of the places he lectured about. He avoided all discussion of politics, poverty, and other social ills.

Personal life
In 1914, Holmes married Margaret Oliver, whom he had met on one of his expeditions. They lived primarily at an estate called "Topside" in the Hollywood Hills that was  a former riding club. Holmes also had a duplex, "Nirvana", in New York that was packed with treasures from Southeast Asia; this he eventually sold to Robert Ripley.

Legacy
Burton Holmes has a star on the Hollywood Walk of Fame. In 2004, 200 reels of Holmes's documentary footage, long thought lost, turned up in an abandoned storage unit. They are currently housed in the George Eastman House film museum.

See also 
Lyman Hakes Howe

References

Bibliography

Works by Holmes
 . v.1, v.5, v.9
 The Traveler's Russia. G.P. Putnam's Sons, 1934.
 The World Is Mine. Culver City, California: Murray & Gee, 1953.
 

Works about Holmes
 
 
 
 
 Wallace, Irving. "Everybody's Rover Boy." In The Sunday Gentleman. New York: Simon & Schuster, 1965.

 Stockham, Ed. "Burton Holmes", song, 2015.

External links

 
The Burton Holmes Archive
Burton Holmes Books and Photos
The Travel Film Archive

Burton Holmes, Extraordinary Traveler

1870 births
1958 deaths
American travel writers
American male non-fiction writers
Writers from Chicago
Burials at Forest Lawn Memorial Park (Glendale)
American photographers
American filmmakers